Al-Dharhi is a sub-district located in Hubaysh District, Ibb Governorate, Yemen. Al-Dharhi had a population of 1540 according to the 2004 census.

References 

Sub-districts in Hubaysh District